Hà Thị Cầu (1928 - 3 March 2013) was a famous Vietnamese xẩm singer. Cầu was one of six traditional singers whose works were selected for study and preservation in the late 1990s. 

Ha Thi Cau was born in 1921 to an extremely poor family in Nam Dinh province. At an early age, she followed her parents as they wandered from town to town singing for money. Xam lyrics and the music of her parents’ generation was absorbed in her heart and mind. Her performance reflected her love for her homeland and family and her passion for Xam singing. She didn’t know how to read and write but she remembered the lyrics of hundreds of songs.

Ha Thi Cau was granted the honorary titles of People’s Artist and Emeritus Artist in 1993, and received VOV’s Certificate of Merit and the special prize for “Cheo artist of Ninh Binh province” at the national festival of Tuong and Cheo singing. In 2008, she was given the Dao Tan award for her contributions to preserving folklore art. Her death was a great loss to Xam music and Vietnamese folk art.

A short documentary called Xẩm Đỏ (Red Xẩm), about the life and art of Ha Thi Cau, was made by filmmaker Lương Đình Dũng in 2012 and released in 2016.

References

1928 births
2013 deaths
20th-century Vietnamese women singers